is a Japanese model and entertainer. She graduated from Seisen Jogakuin Junior High School and Ferris University Faculty of Letters and Department of English.

Biography
Mima has a success as a model for "Maquia Beauty's" of Maquia.

On 2010, she became the weather forecaster of the Tokyo Broadcasting System programs, Hayazuba tsu! Nama Tamago and Asazuba tsu!.

On September 1, 2010, during the planning of, Mima interviewed South Korean actress Kim Tae-hee from the South Korean drama, Iris, which aired on TBS at the time. Because she was a Korean Wave fan, Korean was her second foreign language at Ferris University Faculty of Letters.

Mima knows horse racing, she has a weather casting and modeling boundaries and horse racing as a communication. It was during a broadcast of Hayazuba tsu! Nama Tamago when she shows a horse racing topic in a sports newspaper, and later expected her own race. On 2011, Orfevre won the 78th Tokyo Yūshun, and it was allowed to hit.

Filmography

Magazines

TV series

Radio series

Advertisements

Stills

Photo albums

References

External links
 

Japanese female models
Japanese television personalities
Japanese expatriates in Malaysia
1984 births
Living people
People from Kanagawa Prefecture
Ferris University alumni